Norman Noel Lynas (b 1955) was Dean of Ossory from 1991 to 2010. 
  
Lynas was educated at the University of St Andrews and ordained in 1980.  After a curacy at Knockbreda  he was the Incumbent at Portadown before his time as Dean; and a Canon Residentiary at Bermuda Cathedral. afterwards.

Notes

Alumni of the University of St Andrews
Deans of Ossory
1955 births
Living people